The hybrid elm cultivar Ulmus × hollandica 'Microphylla' was listed in the Loddiges (Hackney, London), Catalogue of 1823 (page 23) as U. stricta microphylla but without description.  A specimen in the Herb. Nicholson at Kew was identified by Melville as U. × hollandica.

Description
Not available.

Cultivation
No specimens are known to survive.

References

Dutch elm cultivar
Ulmus articles missing images
Ulmus
Missing elm cultivars